Fletcherana is a genus of moths in the family Geometridae described by Zimmerman in 1958.

Species
Fletcherana giffardi (Swezey, 1913)
Fletcherana insularis (Butler, 1879)
Fletcherana leucoxyla (Meyrick, 1899)
Fletcherana roseata (Swezey, 1913)

References

Larentiinae